Feller or Fellers may refer to:

 Feller (surname), a list of people with the surname Feller or de Feller
 Fellers (surname), a list of people
 another name for a lumberjack
 Feller College, a former boarding school in Quebec, Canada
 Feller Bach, a tributary of the Moselle River in Rhineland-Palatinate, Germany
 Fellers (1930 film), an Australian comedy

See also
 Fella (disambiguation)
 Fellow (disambiguation)